Hindi rusi bhai bhai ( — "Indians and Russians are brothers") is a political slogan used in India from the 1950s to the 1980s that was officially advocated in India and the Soviet Union. It was declared by Nikita Khrushchev at a meeting in Bangalore on November 26, 1955.

History
The term came from a similar slogan, "hindi chini bhai bhai" declaring brotherhood between the nascent republican India and China between 1954—1962, under the "Five Principles of Peaceful Coexistence, or "pancha shila", ultimately ending with the Sino-Indian War of 1962. Similarly, in the USSR, the slogan "Russians and Chinese are brothers forever", derived from the song Moscow-Peking was seen, a sentiment that ended with the Sino-Soviet split.

The slogan was used in Soviet literature, for example, in the book "Old Man Hottabych" by Lazar Lagin and in the corresponding movie. It also appears prominently in the film "Be prepared, Your Majesty" by Lev Kassil. The usage also continued after the Soviet Union's collapse, such as in the 1991 movie Promised Heaven by Eldar Ryazanov.

The word bhai in Hindi language means "brother" and etymologically corresponds to Russian word брат ("brat"). There are also cognates in other Indo-European languages: brother in English, frāter in Latin, φράτηρ in Greek.

References

1955 in India
1955 in the Soviet Union
Hindi words and phrases
Indian political slogans
India–Soviet Union relations